The Women's 100 metre butterfly competition of the 2018 FINA World Swimming Championships (25 m) was held on 15 and 16 December 2018 at the Hangzhou Olympic Sports Center.

Records
Prior to the competition, the existing world and championship records were as follows.

Results

Heats
The heats were started on 15 December at 10:22.

Semifinals
The semifinals were held at 19:31.

Semifinal 1

Semifinal 2

Final
The final was held at 19:08.

References

Women's 100 metre butterfly